A position line or line of position (LOP) is a line (or, on the surface of the earth, a curve) that can be both identified on a chart (nautical chart or aeronautical chart) and translated to the surface of the earth. The intersection of a minimum of two position lines is a fix that is used in position fixing to identify a navigator's location.

There are several types of position line:
 Compass bearing – the angle between north and the line passing through the compass and the point of interest
 Transit – a line passing through the observer and two other reference points
 Leading line – the line passing through two marks indicating a safe channel
 Leading lights – the line passing through two beacons indicating a safe channel
 Sector lights – the lines created by masked colored lights that indicate a safe channel

See also

 Coordinate line
 Intersection (aeronautics)
 Navigation
 Position circle
 Sight reduction

Navigation
Curves